Coatham Pier or Victoria Pier, Coatham, was a pleasure pier built on Newcomen Terrace in the Coatham area of Redcar on the north-east Yorkshire coast.

Planning and design 

In 1870 a pier for Coatham was proposed.
After much discussion the decision was made to place the pier on Newcomen Terrace at the end of Newcomen Street – renamed Station Road in 1935.

On 22 September 1870 the Coatham Victoria Pier Company was registered and days later an Act of Parliament was obtained to construct the pier.
One pavilion located midway along was for orchestral music and the other, east of the entrance was to house a roller skating rink.

Construction, damage and opening 

Work on Coatham pier started in 1871.
The pier was partially opened to the public from July 1872.

During a storm on 8 December 1874, before construction was complete, two ships collided with the pier – the schooner Griffin of Southampton and the schooner Corrymbus of Dundee causing two breaches in the pier, cutting it in three.
The Griffin with a crew of seven was carrying a cargo of oak in a heavy north easterly storm when in driving rain and high seas the crew failed to see the end of the incomplete pier and collided with it at about 4 am on the 9th.
The crew escaped by climbing onto the pier.
The ship then swung round in the gale and went through the pier broadside on and beached a mile up Coatham Sands.

In the same storm the Corrymbus was driven through the pier between the pavilions then grounded a mile and a half up Coatham Sands.
The crew came ashore when the tide receded.
That night a total of four vessels came ashore on that stretch of coast but due to the actions of the rocket men, lifeboat and coastguard there were no deaths.

The pier was complete by 1875 opening that year.

Operation and destruction 

The pier was shorter than originally planned but it still had the music pavilion halfway along, the indoor roller skating rink pavilion and two kiosks at the entrance, one for a toll booth and the other for selling newspapers and books.

On 22 October 1898 Coatham Pier was badly wrecked by the  barque Birger from Rauma in Finland carrying a cargo of salt from San Carlo in Spain to Abo in Finland.
In a major storm the boat was forced over Saltscar Rocks snapping her masts killing the captain and chief officer and made a  breach in the pier isolating the music pavilion.
The ship was wrecked and only two crew members were rescued while thirteen people died.
The bodies were washed ashore in places from Saltburn to Seaton Carew and buried there.
The Birger was off the Norwegian coast when she was blown across the Dogger Bank and hit further trouble when she sprung a leak and lost her bilge pump.
Distress signals from the Birger were seen off Robin Hood's Bay as the boat was blown up the coast by the intense gale.

The isolated section of the pier collapsed a year later and was dismantled.
In 1899, the pier company failed, and the remainder of the pier was abandoned to disintegrate and was eventually sold for scrap.
This left the roller skating rink pavilion and the entrance kiosks.
Years later the anchor of the Birger was found by divers, brought ashore and placed in a railed off sea front display near the Zetland Lifeboat Museum.

Redevelopment 

In 1910 the roller skating pavilion was demolished by the local authority and replaced by a large glass and metal shelter nicknamed The Glasshouse incorporating the entrance kiosks.

In 1928 the pavilion and kiosks were removed and the site redeveloped as the New Pavilion theatre.
Larry Grayson, Mike Neville and others performed there.
In 1964 the theatre was converted to the Regent Cinema.
On an exterior wall of the cinema is a blue plaque commemorating the Victoria Pier.

References

Further reading 

 Beside the Seaside: A History of Yorkshire's Seaside Resorts, John Heywood, Pen and Sword, (2018) 192 pp.
 Yorkshire Seaside Piers by Martin Easdown, Wharncliffe Books, Pen and Sword (2008) 152 pp.

 Piers in Yorkshire